"Monkey hanger" is a colloquial nickname by which people from the town of Hartlepool, England are sometimes known.

Origin of the name 
According to local folklore, the term originates from a likely apocryphal incident in which a monkey was hanged in the town of Hartlepool, England. During the Napoleonic Wars, a French chasse-marée was wrecked in a storm off the coast of Hartlepool. The only survivor from the ship was a monkey, allegedly dressed in a French Army uniform to provide amusement for the crew. On finding the monkey on the beach, a group of locals decided to hold an impromptu trial. Because the monkey was unable to answer their questions, and because they had seen neither a monkey nor a Frenchman before, they concluded that the monkey must be a French spy. Being found guilty, the animal was duly sentenced to death and summarily hanged on the beach.

An earlier and remarkably similar monkey-hanging legend, with a similar associated song, refers to the inhabitants of Boddam, Aberdeenshire. With comparable lyrics and scansion ("And the Boddamers hung the Monkey, O"), it is plausible that 19th-century Tyneside concert hall songwriter and performer, Ned Corvan, heard and adapted the song while travelling in the Scottish Lowlands with Blind Willie Purvis.

The Monkey Song
The earliest evidenced mention of the hanging is from the popular song, written and performed by 19th-century comic performer, Ned Corvan, "The Monkey Song". Given that "only after Corvan's appearances in Hartlepool is there any strong evidence for the development of the Monkey story", the song itself seems the most plausible origin for the myth.

In popular culture

The local football club, Hartlepool United F.C., capitalised on their "Monkey Hangers" nickname by creating a mascot called "H'Angus the Monkey" in 1999. Two of the town's six rugby union clubs use variations of the hanging monkey, Hartlepool Rovers crest being a beret wearing monkey hanging from a gibbet, while Hartlepool RFC neckties sport a rugby ball kicking monkey suspended from a rope. One wearer of the monkey suit, Stuart Drummond, unexpectedly became the first directly elected mayor of Hartlepool in 2002 while in the guise of H'Angus, but was forbidden from wearing the costume while in office. A statue of the monkey has been erected on the Headland; another at Hartlepool Marina (formerly in West Hartlepool) also serves to collect coins for a local hospice. Although some Hartlepool residents find the term "monkey hanger" insulting, a large number of residents have embraced the term and celebrate it as an important and unique characteristic of the town; as seen in the 2014 documentary Heart of the Pools.

The French comic book Le Singe de Hartlepool by Wilfrid Lupano and Jérémie Moreau published in 2012 tells this story.

In 2008, a novel based on the legend called The Hartlepool Monkey, written by Sean Longley, was published. The novel tells the story of the monkey, named Jacques LeSinge by the French doctor who discovers him, that was supposedly hanged. In the book, the monkey talks and possesses several other human characteristics.

The Hartlepool Monkey also featured prominently in the play Bestiary, written by Jim Burke and broadcast on BBC Radio 4 in 2003.

In 2014, a documentary was made  about the Hartlepool Monkey and its long-lasting significance to the city and its inhabitants called Heart of The Pools.

A radio play by Ian Martin, The Hartlepool Spy, was broadcast on BBC Radio 4 on Christmas Day 2018, with a cast including Michael Palin, Vic Reeves, Toby Jones, Gina McKee and Monica Dolan.

The Northumbrian singer/songwriter Jez Lowe has a satirical song "The Simian Son" (originally known as "The Monkey's Revenge") that was performed first in 2012.  In it, the grandson of the ill-fated monkey reveals the simian curse under which Hartlepool has been living since the hanging.

The Spanish-Portuguese co-produced short animated film The Monkey (2021) was based on the story of The Hartlepool Monkey. The film changes the setting from England to Ireland and from the Napoleonic Wars to the Anglo-Spanish War (1585–1604) and concerning the Spanish Armada in Ireland. The film,  which stars Colm Meaney won the Goya, for best Best Animated Short Film in 2021.

See also 
 List of British regional nicknames
 Mackem
 Mary (elephant)
 Smoggie

References 

Hartlepool
Hartlepool United F.C.
Monkeys
Regional nicknames
Northumbrian folklore
English folklore
Napoleonic Wars